In music, Op. 10 stands for Opus number 10. Compositions that are assigned this number include:

 Beethoven – Piano Sonata No. 5
 Beethoven – Piano Sonata No. 6
 Beethoven – Piano Sonata No. 7
 Brahms – 4 Ballades
 Britten – Variations on a Theme of Frank Bridge
 Chopin – Études Op. 10
 Dohnányi – Serenade in C major
 Duruflé – Quatre Motets sur des thèmes grégoriens
 Dvořák – Symphony No. 3
 Enescu – Piano Suite No. 2
 Ginastera – Cinco canciones populares argentinas
 Ippolitov-Ivanov – Caucasian Sketches, Suite No. 1
 Mozart – Haydn Quartets
 Prokofiev – Piano Concerto No. 1
 Rachmaninoff – Morceaux de salon, Op. 10
 Ries – Violin Sonata No. 5
 Schumann – 6 Concert Studies on Caprices by Paganini
 Shostakovich – Symphony No. 1
 Strauss – Die Nacht
 Vivaldi – La tempesta di mare
 Vivaldi – Six Flute Concertos, Op. 10